Jean Coutu (March 31, 1925 – November 1, 1999) was a Canadian actor.  Born in Montreal, his career included many movies and TV series in Quebec, including episodes of La famille Plouffe in 1953. He also played in a Disney production Nikki, Wild Dog of the North, becoming one of the few Quebecers of his era to have appeared in Hollywood productions.

After his death in 1999, he was entombed at the Notre Dame des Neiges Cemetery in Montreal.

His daughter, Angèle Coutu, is also an actress.

Filmography

References

External links
 
 

1925 births
1999 deaths
Canadian male television actors
Canadian male film actors
Male actors from Montreal
20th-century Canadian male actors
Burials at Notre Dame des Neiges Cemetery